

Events

April events
 April 6 - Freight transportation on Alaska Railroad between Fairbanks and Anchorage resumes after repairs from an earthquake that occurred on March 27.

 April 20 - The Skokie Swift high-speed rapid transit route of the Chicago Transit Authority 'L' system begins service between the Howard Street Terminal in Rogers Park and Dempster Street in Skokie.
 April 29 - The Keiō Dōbutsuen Line in Japan opens.

June events
 June 6 - Southern Railway 4501 is taken down to Chattanooga, Tennessee for restoration by the Tennessee Valley Railroad Museum.
 June 15 - The 2000-series rapid transit cars (2001–2180), built by Pullman-Standard of Chicago, Illinois, are placed in service on the Chicago "L" system. These cars represent the first generation of the Chicago Transit Authority High Performance Family.
 June 19 - United States President Lyndon B. Johnson presides over the groundbreaking ceremonies for Bay Area Rapid Transit (BART).
 June 30 - End of regularly scheduled steam locomotive service on the narrow gauge White Pass and Yukon Route.

July events
 July - The Urban Mass Transportation Act of 1964 becomes law in the United States.

September events
 September 30 - The Railway Preservation Society of Ireland is formed.

October events
 October 1 - The Tōkaidō Shinkansen high-speed route commences operation in Japan; it is the first of many Shinkansen routes to be constructed.
 October 9 - End of District line service to Hounslow on the London Underground.

November events
 November 5 - Swaziland Railway opened.
 November 15 - Shin-Sayama Station on what becomes the Seibu Railway's Seibu Shinjuku Line in Sayama, Saitama, Japan, is opened.

December events
 December 19 - The Elektrische Bahn Stansstad–Engelberg in Switzerland reopens with a connection to the national rail network at Hergiswil and conversion to 15 kV AC railway electrification as the Luzern–Stans–Engelberg railway line.
 December 23 - Tokyo Metro Tōzai Line is opened.

Unknown date events
 The Wabash, Nickel Plate Road, Pittsburgh and West Virginia and Akron, Canton and Youngstown railroads are all merged into the Norfolk & Western.
 Swiss Federal Railways introduces its Re 4/4II series electric locomotives, built by SLM.
 Double-deck cars introduced on suburban railways in Sydney, Australia.
 Benjamin Biaggini succeeds Donald Russell as president of the Southern Pacific Company, parent company of the Southern Pacific Railroad.
 Donald Russell assumes the position of chairman of the Board of Directors of the Southern Pacific Company, a position that was nonexistent since Hale Holden's departure in 1939.
 ALCO is purchased by the Worthington Corporation.
 The above-ground portion of Pennsylvania Railroad's Pennsylvania Station in New York City is demolished to make room for Madison Square Gardens, but the tracks remain in use today.
 Robert A. "Bob" Emerson succeeds Norris Roy Crump as president of Canadian Pacific Railway.

Accidents

Births

Deaths

References